is a railway station in the city of Jōetsu, Niigata, Japan, operated by the third-sector railway operator Echigo Tokimeki Railway.

Lines

Station layout
The station consists of two opposed elevated side platforms, with the station building at ground level. The station is unattended.

Platforms

History
The station opened on 1 July 1911. The station was relocated to its present location on 1 October 1969. With the privatization of Japanese National Railways (JNR) on 1 April 1987, the station came under the control of JR West. From this date, Nadachi Station was transferred to the ownership of the third-sector operating company Echigo Tokimeki Railway.

Passenger statistics
In fiscal 2017, the station was used by an average of 99 passengers daily (boarding passengers only).

Surrounding area
Nadachi Beach
Nadachi Post Office
Nadachi Junior High School

See also
 List of railway stations in Japan

References

External links

Train timetables 

Railway stations in Niigata Prefecture
Railway stations in Japan opened in 1911
Stations of Echigo Tokimeki Railway
Jōetsu, Niigata